Begonia crateris is a plant species of the genus Begonia in the family Begoniaceae, first described by Arthur Wallis Exell in 1944. It is endemic to São Tomé Island, and grows up to 3 metres tall. It closest relative is Begonia baccata, also endemic to São Tomé.

References

crateris
Flora of São Tomé Island
Endemic flora of São Tomé and Príncipe
Taxa named by Arthur Wallis Exell